The Docklands Light Railway extension to Dagenham Dock was a proposed extension of the Docklands Light Railway to Dagenham Dock in East London, to serve the Barking Riverside development and the wider Thames Gateway area. 

First proposed in 2003, it was anticipated that the project could be completed and open for use by 2017, at a cost of around £750m. In November 2008, the Mayor of London Boris Johnson announced that due to financial constraints the extension, along with a number of other transport projects, had been cancelled. The Barking Riverside development is now served by an extension of the London Overground to a new station at Barking Riverside which opened in July 2022. Costing around £325m, the Overground extension cost around half as much as the DLR extension.

Proposed route and stations

The proposed route would have diverged from the Beckton branch at Gallions Reach station in the London Borough of Newham. It would have followed the River Thames north bank, crossing the mouth of the River Roding in a bored tunnel south of the Barking Flood Barrier. Here the route would have entered the London Borough of Barking and Dagenham, following the River Thames on a viaduct before heading northwards to reach Goresbrook and Dagenham Dock.

The 2007 consultation noted that the DLR could be extended further from Dagenham Dock, such as north towards Dagenham Heathway or east towards Rainham. The London Borough of Barking and Dagenham supported these additional extensions, provided it could be achieved without negatively impacting on existing infrastructure in the area.

Project development
The extension of the DLR was first proposed in 2003 as part of the Thames Gateway project. In 2007 a number of route options went to public consultation, with a decision made in November. An application for a Transport and Works Act order was made during 2008. A public inquiry was due to take place but this was postponed, following the announcement by Mayor of London Boris Johnson in November 2008 that the project had been cancelled.

Following the cancellation of the extension, Transport for London assessed various options to bring transport links to Barking Riverside, including the previously proposed DLR extension - as planning regulations limit the number of homes to 1,200 until adequate public transport is provided. 

Subsequently, the Gospel Oak to Barking Line of the London Overground was extended from Barking to a new station in Barking Riverside to serve the area. This opened in July 2022, at a cost of around £325m.

References

Proposed railway lines in London
Transport in the London Borough of Newham
Transport in the London Borough of Barking and Dagenham
Thames Gateway
Docklands Light Railway